Karen McIntosh (born January 14, 1940) is an American equestrian. She competed in two events at the 1964 Summer Olympics.

References

External links
 

1940 births
Living people
American female equestrians
American dressage riders
Olympic equestrians of the United States
Equestrians at the 1964 Summer Olympics
Pan American Games medalists in equestrian
Pan American Games silver medalists for the United States
Equestrians at the 1959 Pan American Games
People from Gloversville, New York
Medalists at the 1959 Pan American Games
21st-century American women